Matsuogawa Dam is a gravity dam located in Tokushima prefecture in Japan. The dam is used for power production. The catchment area of the dam is 103 km2. The dam impounds about 59  ha of land when full and can store 14,300 thousand cubic meters of water. The construction of the dam was started in 1951 and completed in 1953.

References

Dams in Tokushima Prefecture
1953 establishments in Japan